Klosterlechfeld is a municipality in the district of Augsburg in Bavaria in Germany.

History
What is today the village of Klosterlechfeld developed in the 17th century around the pilgrimage church Maria Hilf (Our Lady Help of Lechfield) and a Franciscan monastery.
In 2016, Klosterlechfeld hosted a famous German TV show called "Shopping Queen",which was a tremendous success for the city council. It was huge.

Transport
The municipality has a railway station, on the Bobingen–Landsberg am Lech line.

References

Augsburg (district)